How to Make a Bird by Australian author Martine Murray is a 2003 children's novel which centres on a young adolescent girl called Mannie. Mannie has faced a myriad of losses and challenges throughout her short life. Little by little they begin to make her question her identity. In order to escape her insecurities about who she is, Mannie decides to embark on a journey of self-discovery, enlightenment and acceptance. The book was the winner of the Queensland Premier's Literary Awards Young Adult award in 2004,

Themes 
How to Make a Bird deals with many themes; however, the most prominent are those of loss, family breakdown, love, acceptance and identity. 

 Loss 
Loss is explored thoroughly in the story of birds and dogs as well as cats and is most evident when Mannie loses a family member in a car accident. 

 Family breakdown 
This theme is apparent during the entire book as Mannie’s family is slowly reduced one family member at a time until she is only left with her grief-stricken father. 

 Love 
The theme of love is conveyed effectively when Mannie experiences her first romance with a boy. We see the impact this has on her life and challenges which follow the commencement of this relationship.

 Acceptance 
During the novel Mannie faces a series of losses which she struggles to accept. After running away she makes several discoveries about not only herself but her family which allow her to finally accept her family member's death and absence from her life.

Setting 
How to Make a Bird is set in a variety of locations. One of the primary places in which the story takes place is a small country town somewhere near Castlemaine and Harcourt in Victoria. It is in this town that Mannie grows up and faces various hardships. The other main setting is Melbourne. This is where Mannie goes when she runs away.

References

External links 
 Author's blog, with a "Behind the Story"
 Publisher's teachers notes

2003 novels
Australian children's novels
Novels set in Victoria (Australia)
2003 children's books